Sentenced was a Finnish gothic metal band that played melodic death metal in their early years. The band formed in 1989 in the town of Muhos and broke up in 2005.

History

Early years (1988–1991)

Sentenced started in 1988 as Deformity and changed their name to Sentenced in 1989, after a few line-up changes. The original line-up consisted of Miika Tenkula (lead guitar and vocals), Sami Lopakka (guitar), Vesa Ranta (drums), and Lari Kylmänen (bass). They recorded two demo tapes: When Death Joins Us... in 1990 and Rotting Ways to Misery in 1991. The band actually got their very first record deal (with the French label Thrash Records) after their first demo.

Shadows of the Past (1991–1993)

In 1991, bassist Taneli Jarva joined the band, replacing Kylmänen just as the band was about to record their debut album, Shadows of the Past. At that time, their musical style was fast, typical European death metal. In Spring 1992, they recorded a three-song promotional tape, Journey to Pohjola, and as a result got a deal with the Finnish Spinefarm Records. By the year of 1992 had done over 50 live shows and sold all 1500 copies of their debut album Shadows of the Past, their earlier 2 demos and a lot of merchandise.

North from Here (1993–1994)

The second album, North from Here, was released in the spring of 1993, and later that year The Trooper EP. Jarva had assumed lead vocal duties using a different style than Tenkula's. It was North From Here that earned the band the attention of German record label Century Media Records, and in 1994 Sentenced left Spinefarm in order to head toward a wider market with a new multi-album contract under Century Media.

Amok (1994–1996)
In 1995, Sentenced released their 'break through' album, Amok, which is considered by many to be their best work. Compared to earlier releases, the music had slowed down somewhat, acquiring a more melodic structure. The track "Nepenthe" was complemented with a music video and the band took to tour Europe in two full-length tours supporting Samael and Tiamat.

In autumn, the band released the Love & Death CD. Music-wise, it kept a fairly similar concept as Amok, as the songs had been written around the same time. Sentenced had achieved success in doom/death markets, but Jarva left the band because of musical differences.

Down (1996–1998)

After Jarva's departure, Ville Laihiala (of Breed fame) joined the band in 1996, just weeks before the band was due to head to Germany to record their fourth album Down with producer Waldemar Sorychta. Once again, the music became more melodic with a significant NWOBHM influence. During this time, bassist Sami Kukkohovi also joined the band, but only as a session member on gigs. Later, in spring 1997 he was granted a permanent slot in the line-up. The "Down" album gained great reviews in music-magazines all over the world, and was named Album of the month in German magazines such as Rock Hard and Metal Hammer. 1996 and the following year, saw Sentenced on a worldwide success crusade.

Frozen (1998-2000)

Sentenced's fifth full-length album, Frozen, was also recorded at the Woodhouse Studios, and released in 1998, its style is similar to Down. Laihiala and Kukkohovi had become initiated into the band, so they participated in the composition process, resulting in the next album: Frozen. In 1999, a special edition of Frozen was released, containing a re-colored (gold) cover and rearranged track running order, with four cover songs included.

Crimson (2000–2002)

The next Sentenced album to be released was Crimson in 2000. The single "Killing Me, Killing You" demonstrated the band's turn away from melodic death metal. The album was followed by an extensive tour. That was the first time the band visited USA. The album peaked in 1st place on the Finnish album chart.

The Cold White Light (2002–2004)

Two years after the release of The Cold White Light, the band was seen in a slightly different light, the lyrics displaying some self-irony and even a rare positive edge. They released the single "No One There" which peaked The Finnish Charts at Number 1 following that with an extensive USA tour alongside Killswitch Engage, Dark Tranquillity and In Flames. The album peaked 45th place in the German album chart. The single "No One There" was on the 1st place as well in the Finnish single chart. The band went on a European Tour with Lacuna coil.

After The Cold White Light, they released a CD single in 2003 along with songs by other bands on a four track compilation single that was dedicated to Oulun Kärpät, the ice hockey team of the band's hometown, Routasydän (translates to "Heart of Permafrost") remains the only song Sentenced sang in Finnish, and cannot be found elsewhere. The song caused something of a stir in Finland, as several politicians reviewed the lyrics and purported them to contain Nazi overtones, which the band has steadfastly refuted.

The Funeral Album and final gigs (2005)

In early 2005 the band announced that their following release, The Funeral Album, would be their last. They performed farewell gigs during the spring and summer and ended with a final show on 1 October 2005 in their hometown Oulu. The concert film Buried Alive, directed by Mika Ronkainen, filmed at the funeral gig, was premiered at Oulu Music Video Festival on 9 September 2006. In 2005 The Funeral Album was awarded gold status in Finland for sales in excess of 15,000 copies, footage of the event is filmed in the Buried Alive DVD! The CD topped the Finnish album chart upon its release in May 2005 and made it to position No. 49 on the German Media Control chart. "Ever-Frost" single went straight to 1st position on Official Finnish Single Chart staying there for 6 straight weeks.

Aftermath (2006–present)

Sentenced have been awarded Platinum in the band's native Finland for their posthumous live DVD Buried Alive. The trophy was handed out to the band's former members at the Century Media 20th anniversary party at the Tavastia club in Helsinki on 14 August 2008, where Poisonblack and labelmates Norther and Kivimetsän Druidi played exclusive gigs to properly celebrate this special event.

All hope for the band to return was gone when guitarist and founding member Miika Tenkula died on 19 February 2009. On 26 June 2009 it was announced by his family that Miika died from a heart attack caused by a genetic heart condition that he had for many years previous to the break-up. He is buried in the Kirkkosaari cemetery in his hometown Muhos.

On 13 November 2009, Sentenced released a box set of 16 CDs and 2 DVDs chronicling their entire career in a coffin-shaped box. The box-set also included rare and previously unreleased tracks.

In 2011 a tribute CD was released by a couple of Russian bands. The CD is called "Russian Tribute To Sentenced".

On 12 December 2014, a book written by Matti Riekki, a Finnish rock journalist, about the band's history was released. It is named "Täältä Pohjoiseen - Sentencedin Tarina". After years of being available in Finnish only, an English translation was released in 2021. The title translates to "North from Here – The Story of Sentenced."

Vesa Ranta released a photo book Agony Walk – On the Road with Sentenced in September 2019. Sami Lopakka released his first novel Marras in January 2014. The novel is about a fictional Oulu-based metal band's European tour and has elements inspired by his experiences when previously touring with Sentenced.

Members

Final lineup
 Miika Tenkula – lead guitar (1989–2005; died 2009), vocals (1989–1992)
 Sami Lopakka – rhythm guitar (1989–2005)
 Vesa Ranta – drums (1989–2005)
 Ville Laihiala – vocals (1996–2005)
 Sami Kukkohovi – bass (1997–2005)

Prior members
 Lari Kylmänen – bass (1989–1991)
 Taneli Jarva – bass (1991–1995), vocals (1992–1995)

Tour members
 Niko Karppinen – bass (1995–1996)
 Tarmo Kanerva – drums (1999)

Timeline

Discography

 Shadows of the Past (1991)
 North from Here (1993)
 Amok (1995)
 Down (1996)
 Frozen (1998)
 Crimson (2000)
 The Cold White Light (2002)
 The Funeral Album (2005)

References

External links
 Official band website
 Century Media - official website

Finnish gothic metal musical groups
Finnish melodic death metal musical groups
Musical groups disestablished in 2005
Musical groups established in 1989